A list of notable Italian Social Movement politicians:

A
Gianni Alemanno
Giorgio Almirante
Filippo Anfuso

B
Gino Birindelli
Junio Valerio Borghese
Teodoro Buontempo

C
Antonio Cicchetti
Alfredo Covelli

D
Augusto De Marsanich
Renzo de' Vidovich

F
Lando Ferretti
Gianfranco Fini
Domenico Fisichella
Alessandro Foglietta

G
Maurizio Gasparri
Ezio Maria Gray
Rodolfo Graziani
Almerigo Grilz

L
Ignazio La Russa
Domenico Leccisi

M
Altero Matteoli
Roberto Menia
Domenico Mennitti
Vito Miceli
Arturo Michelini
Massimo Morsello
Cristiana Muscardini
Alessandra Mussolini
Nello Musumeci

P
Biagio Pace
Nicola Pasetto
Giorgio Pini
Umberto Pirilli
Adriana Poli Bortone

R
Pino Rauti
Giovanni Roberti
Pino Romualdi

S
Giuseppe Scopelliti
Tomaso Staiti di Cuddia delle Chiuse
Francesco Storace

T
Giuseppe Tatarella
Salvatore Tatarella
Mirko Tremaglia

 
Italian Social movement